The 1931 USC Trojans football team was an American football team that represented the University of Southern California (USC) in the Pacific Coast Conference (PCC) during the 1931 college football season. In their seventh season under head coach Howard Jones, the Trojans lost the opening game to Saint Mary's and then won the remaining ten games of the season. They finished the season with a 10–1 record (7–0 against PCC opponents), shut out six of eleven opponents, outscored all opponents by a total of 363 to 52, and won the PCC and national championships.

National championship
The Dickinson System rankings were released on December 12, 1931, and ranked USC No. 1 and Tulane Green Wave No. 2. The 1932 Rose Bowl matched No. 1 USC against No. 2 Tulane with USC prevailing by a 21–12 score. After their victory in the Rose Bowl, the Trojans were presented with the Albert Russel Erskine Trophy for the 1931 national football championship.  

In addition to Dickinson, USC was recognized as the 1931 national champion by the great majority of later rankings and analyses, including the Billingsley Report, Boand System, College Football Researchers Association, Dunkel System, Helms Athletic Foundation, Houlgate System, National Championship Foundation, Poling System, Sagarin Ratings, and Berryman (QPRS).

Awards and honors
Two USC players, fullback Gaius Shaver and guard Johnny Baker, were selected as consensus first-team players on the 1931 All-America college football team. Shaver led the team with 938 rushing yards and 90 points scored. Two other USC players received first-team All-America honors from at least one selector: halfback Erny Pinckert (AP, NEA, Liberty) and center Stan Williamson (Liberty).

Eight USC players received first-team honors on the 1931 All-Pacific Coast football team: quarterback Gaius Shaver (AP-1, UP-1); quarterback Orville Mohler (NEA-1); halfback Erny Pinckert (AP-1, NEA-1, UP-1); ends Ray Sparling (AP-1) and Garrett Arbelbide (NEA-1); tackle Ernie Smith (AP-1); guard Johnny Baker (AP-1, NEA-1, UP-1); and center Stan Williamson (AP-1, NEA-1, UP-1).

Schedule

Roster
 Garrett Arbelbide, end
 Johnny Baker, guard (College Football Hall of Fame)
 Dick Barber
 Homer Griffith
 Orville Mohler, quarterback
 Jim Musick
 Erny Pinckert, halfback (College Football Hall of Fame)
 Gaius Shaver, fullback/quarterback
 Ray Sparling, end
 Ernie Smith, tackle
 Stan Williamson, center

References

USC
USC Trojans football seasons
College football national champions
Pac-12 Conference football champion seasons
Rose Bowl champion seasons
USC Trojans football